Thuravoor Viswambharan (September 5, 1943 – October 20, 2017), was a Sanskrit scholar, active social worker and writer from the Thuravoor village in the southern state Kerala in India. He was an expert professor on Hindu epics Ramayana, Mahabharatha and Vedas. He was a professor in Malayalam, Sanskrit, Indian Mythology and Vedic Science at Maharaja's College Ernakulam, Cochin. He was the state president of Tapasya Kala Sahithya Vedi and the founder president of Vishwa Samvad Kendra Kerala.

Notes and references

External links
Bharatha Dharsanam – Amrita TV

1943 births
2017 deaths
Indian Vedic scholars
People from Alappuzha district
Academic staff of Maharaja's College, Ernakulam
Deaths from cancer in India